Maximiliano Hernández (born September 12, 1973) is an American actor. He is best known for portraying Agent Jasper Sitwell in the Marvel Cinematic Universe and FBI Agent Chris Amador in the first season of The Americans.

Early life
A native of Brooklyn, New York of Honduran descent, Hernández began acting in high school. He briefly studied acting at the Leonard Davis Center for Performing Arts and worked as a stage actor before moving to Los Angeles, California.

Career
Early in his career, Hernández appeared in episodes of Law & Order, 24 and Numbers, as well as the film Hotel for Dogs. He had parts in the films Pride and Glory and Warrior, both from director Gavin O'Connor.

Hernández made brief appearances as the Marvel Comics character Jasper Sitwell in 2011's Thor, 2012's The Avengers, and 2019's Avengers: Endgame as part of the Marvel Cinematic Universe franchise. He reprised the role in the Marvel One-Shots short films The Consultant and Item 47, the first season of Agents of S.H.I.E.L.D., and the 2014 film Captain America: The Winter Soldier.

In 2013, he appeared in the premiere season of The Americans as Chris Amador, an FBI agent. The project reunited him with Gavin O'Connor, who directed the pilot. Hernández exited the series in the ninth episode. Andy Greenwald of Grantland described Hernández's work in the series as "wonderful [...] making a fringe character both memorable and strangely noble in his limited screen time."

In 2015, Hernández portrayed a corrupt state policeman in the crime action-thriller Sicario.

Filmography

Film

Television

Short film

References

External links
 

1973 births
People from Brooklyn
Living people
Male actors from New York City
21st-century American male actors
20th-century American male actors
American male television actors
American male film actors
American people of Honduran descent
Hispanic and Latino American male actors